Crossing Creek is a creek in north-west New South Wales, Australia that flows into Tycannah Creek.

References

Rivers of New South Wales
Murray-Darling basin